An Ruzi (died 489 BC), also called Yan Ruzi, was for a few months in 489 BC ruler of the State of Qi, a major power during the Spring and Autumn period of ancient China.  His personal name was Lü Tu (呂荼), ancestral name Jiang (姜), and An Ruzi was his posthumous title, ruzi meaning "little boy".  Due to his short reign and young age he was not given the normal ducal title.  He was known as Prince Tu before ascending the throne.

Designation as Crown Prince
Prince Tu was the youngest son of Duke Jing of Qi, and his mother was Duke Jing's favourite concubine Yu Si, who was from the minor state of Chunyu.  In the summer of 490 BC, the 58th year of Duke Jing's reign, the crown prince of Qi died.  Although Duke Jing had at least five other grown sons, he decided to make Prince Tu the new crown prince.  Because Prince Tu was a young boy and his mother was of a lowly status, Duke Jing ordered the ministers Guo Xia of the Guo clan and Gao Zhang of the Gao clan to support Prince Tu and exile the other princes to the remote city of Lai.

Reign
Duke Jing died soon afterward in the autumn of 490 BC.  Guo and Gao installed Prince Tu on the throne, and the other princes escaped to the nearby states of Wey and Lu.  However, the next year the Tian and Bao clans, led by Tian Qi and Bao Mu, staged a coup d'etat and defeated the Gao and Guo clans.  Tian Qi brought back Prince Yangsheng, an older half-brother of Prince Tu, from Lu and installed him on the throne, to be known as Duke Dao of Qi.  Bao Mu was reluctant to depose Prince Tu but dared not oppose Tian.  Duke Dao soon killed Prince Tu, who is posthumously known as An Ruzi.  The Tian clan would from then on increasingly dominate the power of Qi, eventually replacing the House of Jiang as rulers of Qi in 386 BC.

Ancestry

References

Monarchs of Qi (state)
5th-century BC Chinese monarchs
489 BC deaths
Child monarchs from Asia
5th-century BC murdered monarchs
Assassinated Chinese politicians
Year of birth unknown